The 1956 Florida Gators football team represented the University of Florida during the 1956 NCAA University Division football season. The season was the seventh for Bob Woodruff as the head coach of the Florida Gators football team. The Gators were led by All-American tackle John Barrow, quarterback Jimmy Dunn, two-way halfbacks Joe Brodsky, Bernie Parrish, Jim Rountree and Jackie Simpson, and defensive back John Symank. The highlights of the season included conference road wins over the Mississippi State Maroons (26–0) in Starkville, Mississippi, the Vanderbilt Commodores 21–7 in Nashville, Tennessee, and the LSU Tigers 21–6 in Baton Rouge, Louisiana, a shutout homecoming victory over the Auburn Tigers (20–0), and a second consecutive win over the Georgia Bulldogs (28–0). Woodruff's 1956 Florida Gators started a promising 6–1–1, but lost their final two games to finish 6–3–1 overall and 5–2 in the Southeastern Conference, placing third in the SEC among twelve teams.

Schedule

Roster
QB Jimmy Dunn, So.

References

Florida
Florida Gators football seasons
Florida Gators football